The Grande at Santa Fe Place is a high-rise residential building in San Diego, California, United States composed of two towers of equal height. Located in the Core district of Downtown San Diego, The Grande at Santa Fe Place was designed by the architect firm Perkins & Company Architecture and Urban Design Inc. The towers are currently tied with Vantage Pointe Condominium as the tenth-tallest buildings in San Diego.

History
The two towers were constructed by Downtown San Diego's largest developer of residential property, BOSA Development Corp., and were designed by Perkins & Company Architecture and Urban Design Inc.  Construction for the South Tower began on April 25, 2002 and was completed in 2004. The North Tower's construction began in 2003 and ended in 2005.

Design
Each tower features 221 residential units, and is based on late-modernist architectural style.

See also
List of tallest buildings in San Diego

References

External links 
North Tower Official Site
South Tower Official Site

Residential buildings completed in 2004
Residential buildings completed in 2005
Residential skyscrapers in San Diego
Twin towers